Cowden Lake is a 128-acre (surface area) public lake located in Montcalm County, Michigan,  east of the town of Coral. Residents with homes and cottages on Cowden Lake represent a mix of permanent residents and Michigan summer vacationers. Like many public lakes in Michigan, waterskiing, tubing (recreation), wakeboarding, fishing, and wake surfing are popular during the summer.

See also
List of lakes in Michigan

References

https://web.archive.org/web/20090615071208/http://www.mcgi.state.mi.us/MRBIS/matchcounty.asp?cnty=59
http://www.city-data.com/zips/49322.html

Bodies of water of Montcalm County, Michigan
Lakes of Michigan